Emmet Township is a township in Union County, South Dakota, United States. The population was 257 at the 2000 census.

Geography
According to the United States Census Bureau, the township has a total area of 36.0 square miles (93.24 km2), all land.

Demographics
At the 2000 census, there were 257 people, 97 households and  76 families residing in the township. The population density was /km2 (/sq mi). There were 100 housing units at an average density of /km2 (/sq mi).  The racial makeup of the township was 99.2% White and 0.8% Asian. Hispanic or Latino of any race were 0.4% of the population.

There were 97 households, of which 39.2% had children under the age of 18 living with them, 72.2% were married couples living together, 3.1% had a female householder with no husband present, and 21.6% were non-families. 20.6% of all households were made up of individuals, and 7.2% had someone living alone who was 65 years of age or older. The average household size was 2.65 and the average family size was 3.08.

History
Emmet Township was organized in 1900 from parts of the neighboring Spink and Prairie Townships in Union County.

References

External links
Entry for Emmet Township, South Dakota in the City-data.com website.
Entry for Emmet Township, South Dakota at the Epodunk.com website.
Profile for Emmet Township, Union County, South Dakota from the U.S. Census website.

Townships in Union County, South Dakota
Sioux City metropolitan area
Townships in South Dakota